The 2004 Temple Owls football team represented Temple University in the college 2004 NCAA Division I-A football season. Temple competed as a member of the Big East Conference.  The team was coached by Bobby Wallace and played their homes game in Lincoln Financial Field.

Schedule

References

Temple
Temple Owls football seasons
Temple Owls football